The prime minister of Tatarstan serves as the head of government of the Republic of Tatarstan, a republic of Russia. Mukhammat Sabirov served as Tatarstan's first prime minister.

List of prime ministers of Tatarstan
 Mukhammat Sabirov (July 5, 1991 – January 17, 1995)
 Farid Mukhametshin (January 17, 1995 – May 27, 1998)
 Mintimer Shaeymiev (acting) (May 27, 1998 – July 10, 1998)
 Rustam Minnikhanov (July 10, 1998 – March 25, 2010)
 Ildar Khalikov (March 25, 2010 – April 3, 2017)
 Aleksei Pesoshin (April 3, 2017 – present) - acting Prime Minister from April 3, 2017, until April 17, 2017

References

Politicians of Tatarstan